The Unidad Deportiva Francisco Gómez Palacio is a multi-use stadium in Gómez Palacio, Durango, Mexico.  It is currently used mostly for football matches and is the home stadium for Constructores.  The stadium has a capacity of 4,000 people.

References

External links

Sports venues in Durango
Unidad Deportiva Francisco Gómez Palacio
Athletics (track and field) venues in Mexico